is a horizontally scrolling shooter developed and released by Capcom as an arcade video game in 1986. The player takes control of a flying mecha suit who must battle an alien army. Side Arms uses a two-directional attacking system similar to Capcom's previous shoot-'em-up Section Z.

Plot 
An evil alien empire known as the Bozon are launching a full-scale attack on Earth. As either Lt. Henry or Sgt. Sanders, the player must pilot a giant space mecha known as a "Mobilsuit" to defeat the aliens. Up to two players can play simultaneously.

Gameplay
The controls consist of an eight-way joystick for moving the Mobilsuit and three action buttons. Side Arms uses two shooting buttons, one for shooting to the left and the other to the right. The third button is used to change between the weapons acquired by the player. There are five types of power-ups that can be acquired by the player: a speed upgrade, an orbital bit that will provide additional firepower with the standard gun, a shotgun that shoots in a fan-shaped range, a three-way shooter, and a mega bazooka launcher that fires a laser beam. The player can choose what power-up their mecha will receive by shooting the power-up icon until getting the item they want. All of the weapons, as well as the mecha's speed, can be upgraded up to two or even three levels depending on the item. There is also a speed downgrade that will reduce the Mobilsuit's speed by one level. There are also two "Auto" power-ups, shaped like the enemy characters from Vulgus: one is shaped like the "Yashichi" and allows the player to fire continuously with either firing button held down; while the other, which is shaped like the "Sakichi", allows the player to shoot upwards, downwards and forwards at the same time, but at a slower rate than the regular shot.

In addition to the standard power-ups, there are two special combination power-ups shaped like the Greek letters α and β that will combine the player's Mobilsuit with an ally. This allows the player to do an eight-directional attack at the same time as their regular attack. When two players are playing this power-up will combine both players' suits instead. One player will move the combined suit and perform the regular attack, while the other will provide the eight-directional attack. If the combined suit gets shot, it will revert both suits into their regular separate states.

Ports

Side Arms was released for the PC Engine on July 14, 1989 in Japan by NEC Avenue. According to Takashi Tateishi, the composer for the PC Engine version, the port was actually developed by Capcom themselves, but published by NEC Avenue to avoid offending Nintendo. This version differs from the arcade game in that it allowed player to change weapons through a sub-menu while pausing the game. However, the PC Engine version lacks the 2-player feature from the arcade game. This port was published in North America during the same year by Radiance Software.

There was also an improved port to the PC Engine CD-ROM, under the name {{nihongo|Hyper Dyne Side Arms Special|サイドアーム・スペシャル}}. This version features a new "Before Christ" mode with various changes to gameplay.

Home computer versions of Side Arms were also released in Europe for the ZX Spectrum, Amstrad CPC, Amiga, Commodore 64, and Atari ST, which were published by Go! and developed by Probe Software.

The original coin-op version of Side Arms is included in Capcom Classics Collection: Remixed for PlayStation Portable and Capcom Classics Collection: Vol. 2 for PlayStation 2 and Xbox.

Reception 
In Japan, Game Machine listed Hyper Dyne Side Arms on their February 1, 1987 issue as being the ninth most-successful table arcade unit of the month.

Computer and Video Games magazine reviewed the PC Engine version in 1989, giving it a 90% score.

Appearances in other games
A "chibi" version of the player's Mobilsuit, called "Mobichan", appears in the game as a power-up item that gives the player an extra life. Mobichan has appeared in many console games released by Capcom during the early 1990s as a mode select cursor such as in the Super Nintendo Entertainment System version of the original Street Fighter II. The arcade game Warriors of Fate features a hidden ending sequence for completing the game on one credit which shows Mobichan and its Player 2 counterpart fighting each other dressed as Ryu and Ken and using their special techniques against each other.

Mobichan appeared as a bonus item in Super Buster Bros., U.N. Squadron and Black Tiger.

Mobichan is the save icon for the Street Fighter Collection (Super Street Fighter II and Street Fighter Alpha 2 Gold) for the PlayStation.

In Namco x Capcom, the two nameless soldiers from Forgotten Worlds are accompanied by the Mobilsuits from Side Arms, who are named Side Arm α and Side Arm β in the game.

It also makes an appearance in Asura's Wrath (Episode 5 intro).

In Project X Zone, Devilotte from Cyberbots summons Mobilsuits α & β during her Solo Unit attack.

In Project X Zone 2, Baby Bonnie Hood from Darkstalkers summons Mobilsuits α & β during her single-unit super attack.

In Mighty Final Fight, Mobichan is seen on the continue screen.

In Street Fighter Alpha 2, when a player wins by the means of a taunt, Mobichan will be seen as the win symbol.

In Warzard, if the player beat the game with one credit they will be able to control Mobichan in the credits sequence and shoot down the letters. Mobichan is also a symbol that can be used when entering a password.

References

External links

 Side Arms Strategy Guide (TurboGrafx-16) and Advertisement (circa 1990) at TurboPlay Magazine Archives

1986 video games
Amiga games
Amstrad CPC games
Arcade video games
Atari ST games
Capcom games
Commodore 64 games
DOS games
Horizontally scrolling shooters
PlayStation 3 games
PlayStation Network games
Romstar games
TurboGrafx-16 games
TurboGrafx-CD games
Video games about mecha
Video games developed in Japan
Xbox 360 games
Xbox 360 Live Arcade games
ZX Spectrum games